Kersignané is a village and principal settlement of the commune of Konsiga in the Cercle of Yélimané in the Kayes Region of south-western Mali.

References

Populated places in Kayes Region